This is a list of mayors of the Council of the City of Campbelltown, a local government area in the south-western region of Sydney, New South Wales, Australia. Campbelltown Council was originally incorporated on 21 January 1882; and was declared a city on 4 May 1968.

The Mayor is elected annually by the Councillors in September for a fixed two-year term. The term was one year before the 2016 election. The current mayor is Cr. George Greiss, a member of the Liberal Party.

Mayors
The following individuals have served as Mayor of the City of Campbelltown:

References

Further reading

Mayors of Campbelltown
Campbelltown
Mayors Campbelltown